Ahichchhatra or Ahikhet() or Ahikshetra, near the modern Ramnagar village in Aonla tehsil, Bareilly district in Uttar Pradesh, India, was the ancient capital of Northern Panchala, a northern Indian kingdom mentioned in the Mahabharata.

A
Most of the city was half a mile north-east of the modern village, with a large mound, popularly called the fort, two miles west of this.  Several significant finds of sculpture, in both stone and (especially) terracotta of the early centuries CE, have been made at the site and are now in various museums.  Excavations have uncovered nine strata, the lowest from before the 3rd century BCE and the latest from the 11th century CE.
Ashwatthama was the king of Ahichchhatra during Mahabharata time.
The city appears to have reached its height during the period of the Gupta Empire.  The region lacks sources of good stone and was a centre for making Indian pottery at various periods, and in the early CE the temples were decorated with unusually large terracotta relief panels and sculptures, many of very high quality.

Names 
The word Ahi means snake or Naga in Sanskrit. Nagas were a group of ancient people who worshiped serpents. The word  means region in Sanskrit. This implies that  was a region of Nagas.

Vividha Tirtha Kalpa, composed by Jain Acharya Jinaprabha Suri in the 14th century CE, mentions Samkhyāvatǐ as the earlier name of Ahichchhatra and describes two Jain temples dedicated to Parshvanatha in the area.  Ahikshetra is mentioned as Shankavai Samkhyavati in Vividhatirthakalpa.

History 
According to Jain Tradition, the history of Ahichchhatra traditionally starts from the period of 1st Tirthankara Rishabhanatha. It was visited by all 24 Tirthankaras. Ahichchhatra is believed to be the place where Parshvanatha, the 23rd Tirthankar of Jainism, attained Kevala Jnana (omniscience).

Its history reaches back to late Vedic times, at which time it was capital of the Panchala kingdom. The name is written Ahikshetras as well as Ahi-chhatra, but the local legend of Adi Raja and the Naga, who formed a canopy over his head, when asleep, shows that the later is the correct form. The fort is said to have been built by Adi Raja, an Ahir whose future elevation sovereignty was foretold by Drona, when he found him sleeping under the guardianship of a serpent with expended hood. The fort is also called Adikot.

The last independent ruler of Ahichatra was Achyuta Naga, who was defeated by Samudragupta, after which Panchala was annexed into the Gupta Empire. The coins of Achyuta found from Ahichatra have a wheel of eight spokes on the reverse and the legend Achyu on the obverse.

Archaeology 
The site was briefly explored by Sir Alexander Cunningham in 1871, and then excavated by the ASI from 1940 for "about five years".  The excavations found brick fortifications and continuity of occupation from a period before 600 BCE to 1100 CE. During the first excavations in 1940–44, the Painted Gray Ware pottery were found at the earliest level. Ruins of this city could be identified from the remote sensing imagery of IRS (Indian Remote Sensing) satellites. The ruins reveal that the city had a triangular shape. Recent excavations in Ahichchhatra showed it was first inhabited by the middle of the second millennium BC with Ochre Coloured Pottery culture people, followed by Black and Red Ware culture. Around 1000 BC, it reached at least 40 hectares of area, making it one of the largest Painted Grey Ware culture sites. Evidence of construction of early fortifications were discovered around 1000 BC indicating first urban development. Near Ahichchhatra, 2 km to its west there is a big pond which is said to trace its ancestry to the time of Mahabharata. The pond, located in the village of Jagannathpur is said to have been made by the pandavas at the time of their forest dwelling (vanvas).

In the early Gupta period a section of the city set aside for pottery contained very large firing pits, some 10 or 12 feet deep.

Jain tradition 

Ahichchhatra is believed to be the place where Parshvanatha, the 23rd Tirthankar of Jainism, attained Kevala Jnana (omniscience). The temples in Ahichchhatra are built to commemorate Parshvanatha attaining Kēvalajñāna kalyāṇaka. This temple is dedicated to Parshvanatha and is major Jain pilgrimage center. According to Uttar Pradesh Tourism, Ahichhatra Jain Temple witnessed over 4 lakh visitors in 2017. Ahichhatra Jain Mela is the primary festival of this temple and is organized annually in March.

Means of approach 
From the Revati Bahoda Khera Station on Chandosi – Bareilly Line, vehicle of Kshetra and other vehicles are available.
Road: - Buses are available from Delhi, Meerut, Aligarh, Lucknow, Kasganj & Badaun.
Train: - Trains are available from Delhi, Bareilly, Agra, Moradabad, Aligarh to Revati Bahoda Khera Station and vehicles are all time available for Ramnagar from Revati Bahoda Khera Station.
Airport: - Delhi 250 km

Nearby Places 
Nainital – 180 km
Hastinapur Atishaya Kshetra – 200 km
Kampilji Atishaya Kshetra – 180 km
Manglayatan (Aligarh) – 180 km
Bareilly – 55 km

Sculpture from Ahichchhatra

Notes

References 
 Kala, Satish Chandra, Terracottas in the Allahabad Museum, p. xv, Abhinav Publications, 1980, 9780391022348, google books
 
 
Majumdar, Ramesh Chandra, Vakataka – Gupta Age Circa 200-550 A.D., 1986, Motilal Banarsidass Publ., 9788120800267, google books
 Uttar Pradesh Tourism
 
 
 

Ancient Indian cities
Places in the Mahabharata
Former populated places in India
History of Jainism
Jain temples and tirthas
Indo-Aryan archaeological sites